Nelson Dean (1899 – October 1939) was an American baseball pitcher in the Negro leagues. He played from 1925 to 1932 with several teams.

References

External links
 and Baseball-Reference Black Baseball stats and Seamheads

1899 births
1939 deaths
Birmingham Black Barons players
Cleveland Hornets players
Cleveland Tigers (baseball) players
Kansas City Monarchs players
Detroit Stars players
Memphis Red Sox players
People from Muskogee, Oklahoma
Baseball players from Oklahoma
Baseball pitchers
20th-century African-American sportspeople